2012 UEFA European Under-19 Championship (qualifying round) was the first round of qualifications for the Final Tournament of 2012 UEFA European Under-19 Championship.

The 48 teams were divided into 12 groups of four teams, with each group being contested as a mini-tournament, hosted by one of the group's teams. After all matches have been played, the 12 group winners and 12 group runners-up and the best third-placed team advanced to the Elite round. Estonia qualified as hosts while England, France and Spain received byes to the elite round. Liechtenstein did not enter.

Seeds
The draw took place at 30 November 2010, 10.00 CET.

The hosts of the twelve one-venue mini-tournament groups are indicated below in italics.

Tiebreakers
If two or more teams are equal on points on completion of the group matches, the following criteria are applied to determine the rankings.
 Higher number of points obtained in the group matches played among the teams in question
 Superior goal difference from the group matches played among the teams in question
 Higher number of goals scored in the group matches played among the teams in question
 If, after applying criteria 1) to 3) to several teams, two teams still have an equal ranking, the criteria 1) to 3) will be reapplied to determine the ranking of these teams. If this procedure does not lead to a decision, criteria 5) and 6) will apply
 Results of all group matches:
 Superior goal difference
 Higher number of goals scored
 Drawing of lots
Additionally, if two teams which have the same number of points and the same number of goals scored and conceded play their last group match against each other and are still equal at the end of that match, their final rankings are determined by the penalty shoot-out and not by the criteria listed above. This procedure is applicable only if a ranking of the teams is required to determine the group winner or the runners-up and the third-placed team.

Group 1

Group 2

Group 3

Group 4

Group 5

Group 6

Group 7

Group 8

Group 9

Group 10

Group 11

Group 12

Ranking of third-placed teams
To determine the best third-ranked team from the qualifying round, only the results of the third-placed team against the winners and runners-up in each group are taken into account.

Tiebreakers
The following criteria are applied to determine the rankings.
 Higher number of points obtained in these matches
 Superior goal difference from these matches
 Higher number of goals scored in these matches
 Fair play conduct of the teams in all group matches in the qualifying round
 Drawing of lots

Elite round qualifiers

References

External links
 UEFA.com

Qualification
UEFA European Under-19 Championship qualification

fr:Championnat d'Europe de football des moins de 19 ans 2012